A Contribution to the Critique of Political Economy is a book by Karl Marx, first published in 1859. The book is mainly a critique of political economy achieved by critiquing the writings of the leading theoretical exponents of capitalism at that time: these were the political economists, nowadays often referred to as the classical economists; Adam Smith (1723–90) and David Ricardo (1772–1823) are the foremost representatives of the genre.

Significance
Much of the Critique was later incorporated by Marx into his magnum opus, Capital (Volume I), published in 1867, and the Critique is generally considered to be of secondary importance among Marx's writings. This does not apply, however, to the Preface of the Critique. It contains the first connected account of one of Marx's main theories: the materialist conception of history, and its associated "base and superstructure" model of society, which divides human social development into an economic-technological "base" which "conditions"— not determines — the forms of its political-ideological "superstructure". Briefly, this is the idea that economic factors – the way people produce the necessities of life – conditions the kind of politics and ideology a society can have:

Marcello Musto emphasizes this point: "Even the well-known thesis in the 'Preface' to A Contribution to the Critique of Political Economy...should not be interpreted in a determinist sense; it should be clearly distinguished from the narrow and predictable reading of 'Marxism–Leninism', in which the superstructural phenomena of society are merely a reflection of the material existence of human beings."

Editions
In English, A Contribution to the Critique of Political Economy is available in an edition edited by Maurice Dobb, published by Progress Publishers, Moscow (translation by S. W. Ryazanskaya). Lawrence and Wishart (London), and International Publishers (New York) cooperated in the publication of the Progress Publishers edition.

See also 

 Critique of political economy
 Neue Marx-Lektüre

Notes

References
Evans, Michael (2013). Karl Marx. London: Routledge. First published 1975, London: Allen and Unwin.
Ruhle, Otto (1943). Karl Marx: His Life and Works. New York, 1943. First published, New York, 1929.

External links
 

1859 books
Books by Karl Marx
1859 in economics
Historical materialism